Utada (written: 宇多田) is a Japanese surname. Notable people with the surname include:

 Hikaru Utada, singer-songwriter who has also gone by the stage names of "Cubic U", "Utada Hikaru", and simply "Utada".
 Teruzane Utada (born 1948), a record producer, father of Hikaru Utada.
 Junko Utada (1951–2013), singer and actress, mother of Hikaru Utada, who has gone by the stage name of "Keiko Fuji".

Fictional characters:
 Susumu and Tsuyoshi Utada, from the anime Machine Robo Rescue

Japanese-language surnames